Revy refers to:
 Revy (or "Reve" en français) is a popular local nickname for Revelstoke, British Columbia, Canada.
 Revy, the female protagonist in the Japanese manga and anime Black Lagoon.
 Revy Home and Garden, a former Canadian home improvement retail chain, acquired by Rona in 2001.
 Revy Rosalia, a Netherlands Antilles soccer player.